The Church of St. Paul and St. Peter is a Catholic church and cultural heritage monument in Gjakova, Kosovo.

History 
Gjakova had a Catholic religious tradition, which flourished in the time of Gjon Nikolle Kazazi, the archbishop of the Diocese of Skopje. Catholicy in Gjakova dates back to the medieval ages, but during different periods of Ottoman rule the number of Catholics decreased and, as a result, her parish often ceased to function. The arrival of the Albanian Catholic element from Malësia resulted in the renovation of the old church of St. Peter in Gjakova in 1703, while in 1851 the parish of Gjakova was renovated. The first parish church in Gjakova was in Çabrat and then in the Catholic Quarter. It was dedicated to St. Paul and St. Peter. In the 1999 war it was completely destroyed. A new cathedral was built on the same site.

References 

Buildings and structures in Kosovo
Roman Catholic churches in Kosovo